Mauro De Pellegrini (born 10 October 1955) is an Italian former cyclist. He competed in the team time trial event at the 1980 Summer Olympics.

References

External links
 

1955 births
Living people
Italian male cyclists
Olympic cyclists of Italy
Cyclists at the 1980 Summer Olympics
Cyclists from Emilia-Romagna